The New Orleans Burlesque Festival is an annual, three-day, burlesque festival held in New Orleans. The venues are the Civic Theatre, the Harrah's Casino, and House of Blues. The festival was founded in 2009 and is held in mid-to-late September.

2020 saw the festival go on hiatus and plans to return in 2021.

References

External links
 

Burlesque
Performing arts in Louisiana
Festivals established in 2009
2009 establishments in Louisiana
Festivals in New Orleans